Heming may refer to:

Heming (company), a British jewellery company founded in 1745
Héming, a commune in Lorraine, France
IL Heming, a Norwegian sports club
Michael Heming (1920–1942), British composer
Rob Heming (1932–2023), Australian rugby union player

See also
 Hemings, a surname
 Hemming (disambiguation)